Mount Emmons is a mountain located in the Adirondack Mountains near the southern edge of Franklin County, New York, United States.

Description
The mountain is located within the High Peaks Wilderness Area of Adirondack Park. The mountain (elevation ) is part of the Seward Mountains of the Adirondacks. Mount Emmons is flanked to the north by Donaldson Mountain and is the westernmost of the 46 High Peaks.

The summit is named after Ebenezer Emmons (1799–1863), a geologist who named the Adirondack Mountains and led the first recorded ascent of Mount Marcy in 1837.

Mount Emmons stands within the watershed of the Cold River, which drains into the Raquette River, the Saint Lawrence River in Canada, and into the Gulf of Saint Lawrence.
The east side of Mt. Emmons drains into Seward Brook, thence into the Cold River.
The west side of Emmons drains into Boulder Brook, thence into the Cold River.

See also

 List of mountains in New York
 Northeast 111 4,000-footers 
 Adirondack High Peaks
 Adirondack Forty-Sixers

References

External links

 

Mountains of Franklin County, New York
Adirondack High Peaks
Mountains of New York (state)